The William V. Kelley-Roosevelt Asiatic Expedition was a zoological expedition to Southeast Asia in 1928–1929 sponsored by the Field Museum of Natural History and organized by Kermit Roosevelt and his brother Theodore Roosevelt Jr.

Funding and organization
William Vallangdiham Kelley (1861–1932), a Field Museum trustee and benefactor, financed the expedition, which was extremely well equipped. There were three separate sections of the expedition — one led by the two Roosevelt brothers, another conducted by the British ornithologist Herbert Stevens, and another led by H. J. Coolidge. The mammalogist W. H. Osgood described the expedition's collection of mammalian skins and designated the Roosevelt brothers' section as the first, Stevens's as the second, and Coolidge's as the third. The first section consisted of the two Roosevelt brothers with the naturalist C. Suydam Cutting and their Chinese interpreter.

Itinerary
Stevens accompanied the Roosevelts up the Irrawaddy to the Chinese-Burma border and then in January 1929 went north from Tengyueh with his own caravan. During all of February he collected specimens at the Lijiang bend. He then moved north to collect in Sichuan and spent May in the Wushi hills. After some further collecting he went down the Yangtze to Shanghai, sending 2,400 specimens to the Field Museum. After separating from Stevens's section of the expedition, the Roosevelt brothers with Suydam Cutting went rapidly north to collect specimens of the giant panda. The Roosevelts hunted large mammals that were especially rare. Their party proceeded through Burma to Bhamo and northward to Tatsienlu thence to Mouping. Then going southward through Yachow, they crossed the Qingyi (Tung) River and continued their journey traveling slightly east of the Panlong River and reaching the railhead at Yunnanfu. From there, Kermit Roosevelt returned to the United States upon an urgent request. Theodore Roosevelt, Jr. and Suydam Cutting continued to the vicinity of Saigon to procure specimens of banteng, seladang, and water buffalo.

Hendee departed from Coolidge's party in Laos on 14 May 1929 and started down the Mekong to join Theodore Roosevelt, Jr. and Suydam Cutting in Saigon but shortly after his departure he suffered a severe attack of malarial fever. Taken to a hospital in Vientiane on June 3, Hendee died on June 6.

Discoveries and collections
Coolidge's section of the expedition discovered a new mammalian species Roosevelt's muntjac and a new avian species Macronus kelleyi.

The expedition brought back several living specimens for the U.S. National Zoological Park:

The expedition collected approximately 5000  bird skins.

This collection resulted in the identification of five new species of birds. The expedition collected about 2,000 specimens of small mammals and 40 big mammals, including two giant panda skins (a first for Western museum collectors). The Roosevelt brothers shot and collected one panda and purchased a panda skin from a local hunter. The taxidermic panda specimens are on display in the Hall of Asian Mammals in the Field Museum.

Recounting the expedition

Kermit and Ted Roosevelt recounted their experiences in their book Trailing the Giant Panda. Part of Suydam Cutting's 1940 book The Fire Ox and Other Years deals with the Kelley-Roosevelts expedition.

References

1929 in science
Asian expeditions
Exploration of Southeast Asia
Field Museum of Natural History